Arakan, officially the Municipality of Arakan   is a 1st class municipality in the province of Cotabato, Philippines. According to the 2020 census, it has a population of 50,558 people.

History 

The word Arakan is derived from the Manobo term “ara” which means abundance of natural resources in the valley and “kan” which means heroism, bravery and valor of the early Manobo leaders and settlers of the area. The word “arakan” then was named referring to one of the rivers of the valley. Arakan is basically a territory of a number of ethno-linguistic groups, predominantly of the Manobo-Kulamanon and Manobo-Tinananon tribes. The names of the two (2) big rivers in Arakan were also from these ethnic groups of the Kulaman and Tinanan Rivers. The original settlers of the place are the Manobos, which were believed to have originally come from the string of islands in the Malayan Peninsula and Borneo. This assumption is based on their language structure which has Malayan roots.

Throughout the years, they maintained contacts and inter-marriages with other tribes such as Matigsalogs and other lesser Bagobo tribes. The early migrant settlers from Visayas came in as early as the 1930s. Massive clearing of the forest areas became the order of these years for agricultural and settlement purposes. Due to these activities, the Manobos were forced to settle in the inner portions away from those areas occupied by the Bisayans. They were pushed further still and they permanently inhabited the highlands of the valley to avoid social and cultural interactions with the migrant Bisayans.

Early attempts to fully develop Arakan dated back in the 1970s when then Mayor Froilan Matas of the Municipality of Magpet (mother municipality of Arakan) unified his efforts with the Sangguniang Bayan, which was ably supported by the barangay leaders, and its populace led by Greenfield (now Poblacion) Barangay Chairman Aproniano A. Ebon, Sr. through a resolution strongly manifesting its support to the creation of a separate municipality of Arakan. In 1972, a more unified attempts to create the municipality by the provincial leadership has led the passing of House Bill No. 4805 sponsored by the then Assemblyman Salipada K. Pendatun. The declaration of martial law in the same year deterred its creation. This did not however, dampen the hope of the great leaders of Magpet.

The EDSA Revolution that took place in 1986 paved way to another attempt of the creation of a separate and new municipality through the collaborative efforts of the municipal government of Magpet spearheaded by then Vice Mayor Aproniano A. Ebon, Sr., the provincial leadership headed by then Governor Rosario P. Diaz, M.D. and the most especially by the passage of a house bill sponsored by Congressman Gregorio A. Andolana of the Second District of Cotabato Province.

After five years, the Municipality of Arakan was finally created by virtue of Republic Act No. 7152, approved by President Corazon C. Aquino on August 30, 1991. Under the provision of the Act, it had to elect its new officials in local election on May 11, 1992. The then Vice Mayor Ebon overwhelmingly got the mandate as the first Municipal Mayor, while David B. Figura, Sr. was the first Vice Mayor.  Ebon spent three terms as municipal mayor, as did David B. Figura, Sr. (who died before his last term ended).

Geography

Barangays 
Arakan is politically subdivided into 29 barangays.

Allab
Anapolon
Badiangon
Binoongan
Dallag
Datu Ladayon
Datu Matangkil
Doroluman
Gambodes
Ganatan
Kabalantian
Katipunan
Kinawayan
Kulaman Valley
Lanao Kuran
Libertad
Makalangot
Malibatuan
Maria Caridad
Meocan
Naje
Napalico
Poblacion
Salasang
San Miguel
Santo Niño
Sumalili
Tumanding
Greenfield

Climate

Demographics

Economy

Tourism
 Tinanan River, (in Valencia, Santo Niño) has 6 springs and two unexplored caves.
 Bukatol Cave and Park, (in Bukatol, Barangay Kinawayan). From Mt. Sinaka, the Arakan Valley can be viewed.
 Forest Wildlife Park,  of forest (in Sinai, Barangay Salasang), home to Philippine Eagles and hornbills
 Salasang Cave and Spring (Formon/Natubalan, Barangay Salasang)
 Nabuns Cave (Sitio Langub, Barangay Gambodes)
 Yellow Gate zipline (in sitio Langub, Barangay Gambodes).
 Datu Ladayon Rice Terraces (in Datu Ladayon), the only terraced paddies in the area
Aguas falls (Sitio Dao, Barangay Salasang)

Government
, Gerardo Tuble Sr. is municipal mayor.
Vice Mayor: 
Rene V. Rubino
 Councilors:
 Aproniano A.Ebon Sr.
 Jenefier A. Pangilinan
 Luis Bunsuran
 Richard A. Gayatin
 Leonardo S. Reovoca
 Sumerado Ambato
 Josie V. Nasiluan
 Winnie P. Canario

References

External links
 Arakan Profile at the DTI Cities and Municipalities Competitive Index
 [ Philippine Standard Geographic Code]

Municipalities of Cotabato